Rudrapur may refer to:

 Rudrapur, Uttarakhand, a town in Uttarakhand, India 
 Rudrapur, Uttarakhand Assembly constituency
 Rudrapur, Uttar Pradesh, a town in Uttar Pradesh
Rudrapur, Uttar Pradesh Assembly constituency
 Rudrapur, Nepal, a village development committee in southern Nepal
 Rudrapur, Bangladesh, a village in northern Bangladesh